Heliconia virginalis is a species of plant in the family Heliconiaceae. It is endemic to Ecuador.

References

External links
 Heliconia virginalis observations on iNaturalist

virginalis
Endemic flora of Ecuador
Vulnerable plants
Taxonomy articles created by Polbot